Luc Wirtgen (born 7 July 1998) is a Luxembourgish cyclist, who currently rides for UCI ProTeam . His brother Tom Wirtgen is also a professional cyclist.

Major results
2018
 2nd Road race, National Under-23 Road Championships
2021
 5th Road race, National Road Championships
 9th Tour du Jura
2022
 3rd Overall Tour of Antalya
 4th Overall International Tour of Hellas
 5th Time trial, National Road Championships
 6th Per sempre Alfredo

References

External links

1998 births
Living people
Luxembourgian male cyclists